The 1982 Northern Ireland Assembly elections were held on 20 October 1982 in an attempt to re-establish devolution and power-sharing in Northern Ireland. Although the Northern Ireland Assembly officially lasted until 1986 (and was seen as being a continuation of the Northern Ireland Constitutional Convention of 1975) it met infrequently and achieved very little.

Electoral controversy
The electoral system proved to be hugely controversial. While there was general acceptance that the elections should take part using the Single Transferable Vote system, the decision to use the same twelve constituency boundaries used in the 1973 Assembly election rather than the new seventeen constituency boundaries which were later adopted in the 1983 general election was heavily criticised. The problem was that the Boundary Commission for Northern Ireland's Final Recommendations, which recommended that all future Assembly elections should be held using seventeen constituencies each electing five members, had not yet been approved by Parliament and therefore remained, technically, provisional recommendations.

The consequence of this was that the elections were held using constituencies which varied greatly in size and electorate, ranging from Belfast West with an electorate of 57,726 to South Antrim with an electorate of 131,734. In the latter constituency this resulted in huge administrative problems with a record 27 candidates standing necessitating 23 counts over 36 hours with the count not completed until two days after the election. A further result of the disparity in electorates was that the number of members returned for each constituency varied widely, from four members in Belfast West to ten members in South Antrim.

Response of political parties
On the Unionist side, the Assembly was welcomed, with some hailing it nostalgically as 'a new Stormont'. Consequently, many Nationalists were suspicious of the new body. The Irish Independence Party, which had moderate electoral success in the elections of the previous year, immediately announced that they would boycott the elections and called on other nationalists to follow suit. However Sinn Féin was keen to test its electoral support and both it and the Social Democratic and Labour Party (SDLP) announced that they would contest the elections but refuse to take any seats which they won. The smaller People's Democracy, which had won two council seats in an electoral alliance with the Irish Republican Socialist Party the previous year, did likewise. 
Great interest centred on the performance of Sinn Féin, fighting its first full election and on the inter-Unionist rivalry between the Democratic Unionist Party (DUP) and the Ulster Unionist Party (UUP). The former had pulled ahead in the European election of 1979 and the Local Council Elections of 1981 but had suffered a setback in the 1982 by-election which followed the murder of Robert Bradford.

Results
The results were seen as a triumph for the new electoral strategy of Sinn Féin which gained 5 seats and narrowly missed winning seats in Belfast North and Fermanagh and South Tyrone. The SDLP were disappointed with their 14 seats and one of these was subsequently lost in a by-election to the UUP as Seamus Mallon was disqualified following a successful UUP election petition on the grounds that he was ineligible as he was a member of Seanad Éireann at the time. On the Unionist side the UUP gained a clear lead over the DUP, while the United Ulster Unionist Party failed to make an impact and, as a result, folded two years later. In the centre Alliance Party consolidated with 10 seats including unexpected wins in North and West Belfast. The Workers' Party failed to make a breakthrough despite respectable vote shares in places like North and West Belfast.

Votes summary

Seats summary

See also
Members of the 1982 Northern Ireland Assembly

References

Northern Ireland Assembly Elections 1982
Full Counting Details

Northern Ireland Assembly (1982)
Northern Ireland Assembly election
1982
Northern Ireland Assembly election
1982 elections in Northern Ireland